(born 7 February 1981 in Kyoto, Japan) is a Japanese rugby union player. Kitagawa has played 43 international matches for the Japan national rugby union team.

Kitagawa was a member of the Japan team at the 2011 Rugby World Cup, and played four matches for the Brave Blossoms.

References

Living people
1981 births
Toyota Verblitz players
Japanese rugby union players
Japan international rugby union players
Hino Red Dolphins players
Rugby union locks